The Men's road race of the 2017 UCI Road World Championships was a cycling event that took place on 24 September 2017 in Bergen, Norway. It was the 84th edition of the championship, and Slovakia's Peter Sagan was the two times defending champion.

After a late move from France's Julian Alaphilippe was brought back within the final kilometres, Sagan outsprinted his rivals to win a third consecutive world title, the first male rider to do so. As well as this, he became the fifth man – after Alfredo Binda, Rik Van Steenbergen, Eddy Merckx and Óscar Freire – to win three elite road world championship titles. European champion Alexander Kristoff from Norway took the silver medal, while the bronze medal went to Australian Michael Matthews.

Course
The race started in Rong and traversed  before reaching the finishing circuit in Bergen. After a further , the riders crossed the finish line on the Festplassen for the first time, with the riders completing eleven full laps of the circuit  in length. At , the 2017 men's road race was the longest in the championships since  were covered in 2013.

Qualification
Qualification were based on performances on the UCI World Ranking on August 15, 2017.

UCI World Rankings
The following nations qualified.

Additional places

Participating nations
196 cyclists from 44 nations were entered in the men's road race, however Irish representative Damien Shaw did not start the race. The number of cyclists per nation is shown in parentheses.

Final classification

References

External links
Men's road race page at Bergen 2017 website

Men's road race
UCI Road World Championships – Men's road race
2017 in men's road cycling